Fred Catona was an American entrepreneur and founder of Bulldozer Digital, a direct-response advertising agency located in Blue Bell, Pennsylvania. He is generally recognized as the father of "Direct Response" radio advertising.

Early career 
Upon his graduation from East Stroudsburg University of Pennsylvania with a degree in health and physical education, Catona became a high school health-science teacher and athletics coach. As a child, he dreamed of one day owning his own sandwich shop. In an effort to realize his dream and also further support his family, he opened “The Country Grocer” located in Swarthmore, Pennsylvania. In 1983, as his business thrived, Catona saw a void that up to this time had not been filled. Having been raised in Philadelphia, a city known for many local food specialties, he started a mail-order food company called "A Taste of Philadelphia". The first of its kind anywhere, “A Taste of Philadelphia” afforded people around the world the opportunity to send or receive a gift package complete with such delicacies as cheesesteaks, hoagies (submarine sandwiches), soft pretzels, Tastykakes, and many other food items not easily found outside the Philadelphia area. Also in that year, Catona made national headlines for attempting to be the first to ever send a Philadelphia hoagie into space. He contacted astronaut Guion S. Bluford Jr., a Philadelphia-area native and first African-American in space, asking if he would take one of Catona's hoagies on board the space shuttle Challenger for mission STS-8 that would be taking place in August of that year. After spending for two years with researches and microbiologists from Widener University to develop a hoagie safe for space travel, it was decided by NASA that due to its size and many ingredients, a Philadelphia hoagie would not be a part of that particular space mission.

Life after mail-order

Radio Direct Response
In promoting his mail-order business, he realized the tremendous power that radio had for selling his product. Specifically, he found incredible success giving radio interviews in exchange for advertising by way of commercials and promotional giveaways.  As a result of this success, he developed a direct-response format for radio advertising. Before long, businesses in the infomercial industry began to take notice of Catona's methods and asked for his help getting their message to a larger audience. As more businesses asked for his help, Catona, in 1993, decided to start “Radio Direct Response”, the first advertising agency focusing solely on direct response radio marketing. As the success of “Radio Direct Response” grew, he was approached by entrepreneur Jay Walker with an idea for a new website where consumers could name their own price for airline tickets. Tapping William Shatner as a celebrity spokesperson, Catona developed a campaign for this new website, now called Priceline.com. Within just the first 18 months of its inception, Priceline.com went on to generate 1 billion dollars using direct-response radio alone. Some of Catona's other achievements have included launching FreeCreditReport.com and many other multimillion-dollar companies.

Direct response radio marketing 

Others since the 1920s have used direct response radio marketing but no full service (strategize offer, write commercials, produce the commercial, place the media and track response of how many people called or sent in money) agency was created until 1995 that strictly promoted the use of direct response radio marketing.

The principals of direct response radio marketing are similar to all types of direct response marketing – direct offer to purchase direct from the manufacture, no middle man or broker. The theory is that because there is no middle men there will be lower pricing. For example, it is a common practice for a retail store to double the price for want they paid for a product before selling it to the public. Also chances are the retailer did not buy the product from a manufacture but rather from a broker who also had a mark-up on the product.

Direct response radio marketing usually works directly with manufacturers.

Catona today 
Catona was the founder and chief marketing strategist of Bulldozer Digital, an advertising agency utilizing both direct response radio advertising and Catona's newest development called “Digital Convergence Marketing”, which generates leads to maintain contact with clients potential customers.

References

External links

1946 births
2016 deaths
American advertising executives
American marketing businesspeople
East Stroudsburg University of Pennsylvania alumni